The 2010 Detroit Tigers season was the team's 110th season. This year saw the passing of legendary Tigers broadcaster Ernie Harwell, and nearly saw the first perfect game thrown by a Tigers pitcher. The Tigers spent most of the season in 2nd or 3rd place. The third-place Tigers finished 13 games behind the AL Central Champion Minnesota Twins, with an 81–81 record and failed to make the playoffs.

Austin Jackson made the Tigers' opening day roster, and was American League Rookie of the Month for April.  2010 also saw the debuts of several rookies from the Tiger farm system, including Brennan Boesch, Scott Sizemore, Danny Worth, Casper Wells and Will Rhymes. Boesch was called up on April 23, 2010, and was named the AL Rookie of the Month for May and June.

The Tigers sent three players to the 2010 All-Star game.  Miguel Cabrera and José Valverde were selected as reserves, and starter Justin Verlander was added to the team when another AL starter who was selected was unable to pitch due to scheduling.  At the All-Star break, the Tigers were a half-game out of first place in the AL Central, behind the Chicago White Sox.  But a slow start and injuries to key players Magglio Ordóñez, Carlos Guillén and Brandon Inge shortly after the break sent the Tigers into a tailspin.  Closer Valverde would also suffer a series of nagging injuries down the stretch.  The Tigers finished the season with an 81-81 record, good for third place, 13 games back of the division-winning Minnesota Twins.  While playing outstanding baseball at home, the Tigers were just 29-52 on the road.  Only the Seattle Mariners had fewer road wins than the Tigers among American League teams.

Among the season highlights were Miguel Cabrera hitting .328 with 38 home runs and an AL-best 126 RBI, earning the American League Silver Slugger Award at first base and finishing second in the AL MVP race (earning 5 of 28 first-place votes). Austin Jackson (.293 average, 103 runs, 181 hits, 27 stolen bases) finished second in the AL Rookie-of-the-Year voting. Justin Verlander enjoyed another strong season (18-9 record, 3.37 ERA, 219 strikeouts).  After a slow start and a brief trip to the minors, Max Scherzer showed promise with a 12-11 record, 3.50 ERA and 181 strikeouts.

On July 26, the Tigers were on the losing end of Matt Garza's no-hitter in Tampa.

2009-10 Offseason activities

Personnel changes

On October 9, first base coach Andy Van Slyke announced he is leaving the team.
On November 9, the Tigers hired Tom Brookens as their new first base coach. Brookens played on the 1984 World Series championship team and was most recently the manager of the team's Class-AA affiliate at Erie.

Releases

On November 6, the Tigers removed Marcus Thames and Matt Treanor from their 40-man roster, allowing them to become free agents.
On November 16, the Tigers released Jarrod Washburn and Aubrey Huff to free agency.

On December 1, the Tigers released Plácido Polanco to free agency.
On December 8, Fernando Rodney and Brandon Lyon turned down arbitration and became free agents.

Trades

On December 7, the Tigers traded Clay Rapada to Texas for a player to be named later or cash considerations.
On December 9, the Tigers completed a 3 team deal. They gave Curtis Granderson to the Yankees and Edwin Jackson to the Diamondbacks and received Max Scherzer and Daniel Schlereth from Arizona and Austin Jackson and Phil Coke from New York.
On December 21, the Tigers traded Dusty Ryan to San Diego for cash considerations or a player to be named later.
On March 30, the Tigers traded Nate Robertson and cash considerations to Florida for Jay Voss and cash considerations.

Signings

On November 20, the Tigers purchased the contracts of Scott Sizemore, Audy Ciriaco, Ryan Strieby, and Brennan Boesch.
On December 7, the Tigers signed Brad Thomas.
Also on December 7, the Tigers re-signed Adam Everett to a one-year deal.
On December 16, the Tigers re-signed Ramón Santiago to a two-year deal.
On January 13, the Tigers re-signed Joel Zumaya, avoiding arbitration.
On January 19, the Tigers signed José Valverde to a two-year deal.
Also on January 19, the Tigers re-signed Gerald Laird, Zach Miner and Bobby Seay.
On February 4, it was announced that Justin Verlander and the Tigers have reached a deal for an $80 million, 5-year contract extension.
On February 22, the Tigers signed Johnny Damon to a one-year deal.

Roster

Transactions

On June 1, the Tigers traded Dontrelle Willis and cash considerations to Arizona for Billy Buckner.
On June 6, the Tigers designated Adam Everett for assignment.
On July 28, the Tigers acquired Jhonny Peralta from the Indians in exchange for minor league pitcher Giovanni Soto and cash considerations.

Tributes to Ernie Harwell

On May 4, Tigers broadcaster Ernie Harwell died at age 92. Two days later, Harwell's body lied in repose at Comerica Park, with over 10,000 fans filing past the casket.  In his honor, the Tigers wore patches (shown at right) and flew a flag in the center field of Comerica Park both bearing his initials for the remainder of the season.

The near-perfect game

In the June 2 game against Cleveland, Armando Galarraga had a perfect game going with two outs in the top of the ninth when first base umpire Jim Joyce made a controversial call, ruling a batter safe at first when video replay showed he was out. Joyce later said "I took a perfect game away from that kid, I thought he beat the throw. I was convinced he beat the throw, until I saw the replay." After the game, Galarraga told reporters Joyce apologized to him directly and gave him a hug. Despite large fan support for overturning the call, MLB Commissioner Bud Selig let the call stand, but said he would look into expanding replay beyond home run calls for the future.

It would have been the first perfect game thrown by a Tigers pitcher. Two previous Tigers, Tommy Bridges (1932) and Milt Wilcox (1983), had also come within one out of throwing perfect games before having them broken up by the 27th batter.

Standings

Game log

|- bgcolor="bbffbb"
| 1 || April 5 || @ Royals || W 8–4 || Zumaya (1–0) || Tejeda (0–1) ||  || 40,052 || 1–0
|- bgcolor="ffbbbb"
| 2 || April 7 || @ Royals || L 3–2 (11) || Farnsworth (1–0) || Valverde (0–1) ||  || 10,574 || 1–1
|- bgcolor="bbffbb"
| 3 || April 8 || @ Royals || W 7–3 || Bonine (1–0) || Mendoza (0–1) ||  || 10,909 || 2–1
|- bgcolor="bbffbb"
| 4 || April 9 || Indians || W 5–2 || Porcello (1–0) || Huff (0–1) || Valverde (1) || 45,010 || 3–1
|- bgcolor="bbffbb"
| 5 || April 10	|| Indians || W 4–2 || Bonderman (1–0) || Talbot (0–1) || Perry (1) || 35,332|| 4–1
|- bgcolor="bbffbb"
| 6 || April 11 || Indians || W 9–8	|| Coke (1–0) || Perez (0–1) || || 26,081 || 5–1
|- bgcolor="ffbbbb"
| 7 || April 12 || Royals || L 10–5	|| Hochevar (1–0) || Scherzer (0–1) ||  || 17,058 || 5–2
|- bgcolor="bbffbb"
| 8 || April 13 || Royals || W 6–5 || Zumaya (2–0)  || Hughes (0–1) || Valverde (2) || 18,414|| 6–2
|- bgcolor="ffbbbb"
| 9 || April 14 || Royals || L 7–3 || Davies (1–0) || Perry (0–1) || Soria (2) || 19,262 || 6–3
|- bgcolor="ffbbbb"
| 10 || April 16 || @ Mariners || L 11–3 || Hernández (1–0) || Bonderman (1–1) || || 39,999 || 6–4
|- bgcolor="ffbbbb"
| 11 ||	April 17 || @ Mariners || L 4–2 || League (2–0) || Verlander (0–1) || Aardsma (5) || 31,647|| 6–5
|- bgcolor="bbffbb"
| 12 ||	April 18 || @ Mariners || W 4–2|| Scherzer (1–1) || Snell (0–2) || Valverde (3) || 30,419|| 7–5
|- bgcolor="ffbbbb"
| 13 || April 19 || @ Angels || L 2–0 || Piñeiro (2–1)|| Willis (0–1) || Rodney (4) || 36,006 || 7–6
|- bgcolor="ffbbbb"
| 14 ||	April 20 || @ Angels || L 6–5 || Kazmir (1–1) || Porcello (1–1) || Rodney (5) || 35,266 || 7–7
|- bgcolor="bbffbb"
| 15 ||	April 21 || @ Angels || W 4–3 || Coke (2–0) || Fuentes (0–1) || Valverde (4) ||35,279 || 8–7
|- bgcolor="bbffbb"
| 16 ||	April 22 || @ Angels || W 5–4 || Verlander (1–1) || Saunders (1–3) || Valverde (5) || 37,338 ||  9–7
|- bgcolor="ffbbbb"
| 17 || April 23 || @ Rangers || L 5–4 || Feliz (1–0) || Ni (0–1) ||  || 26,445 || 9–8
|- bgcolor="bbffbb"
| 18 || April 24 || @ Rangers || W 8–4 || Bonine (2–0) || Feldman (1–2) ||  || 45,752 ||  10–8
|- bgcolor="ffbbbb"
| 19 || April 25 || @ Rangers || L 8–4 || Lewis (3–0) || Porcello (1–2) || ||31,211 || 10–9
|- bgcolor="bbffbb"
| 20 || April 26 || @ Rangers || W 8–6 || Coke (3–0) || Feliz (1–1) || Valverde (6) || 16,381 || 11–9
|- bgcolor="ffbbbb"
| 21 || April 27 || Twins || L 2–0 || Liriano (3–0) || Verlander (1–2)  || Rauch (7) || 22,008 || 11–10
|- bgcolor="bbffbb"
| 22 || April 28 || Twins || W 11–6 || Thomas (1–0) || Mahay (0–1) ||  || 19,900 ||  12–10
|- bgcolor="bbffbb"
| 23 || April 29 || Twins || W 3–0 || Willis (1–1) || Pavano (3–2) || Valverde (7) || 25,595 ||  13–10
|- bgcolor="bbffbb"
| 24 || April 30 || Angels || W 10–6 || Porcello (2–2) || Piñeiro (2–3) ||  || 31,725|| 14–10
|-

|- bgcolor="bbffbb"
| 25 || May 1 || Angels || W 3–2 || Perry (1–1) || Shields (0–1) ||  || 31,042 || 15–10
|- bgcolor="bbffbb"
| 26 || May 2 || Angels || W 5–1 || Verlander (2–2) || Weaver (3–1) || || 25,603 || 16–10
|- bgcolor="ffbbbb"
| 27 ||	May 3 || @ Twins || L 10–4 || Baker (3–2) || Scherzer (1–2) ||  || 38,728 || 16–11
|- bgcolor="ffbbbb"
| 28 ||	May 4 || @ Twins || L 4–3 || Blackburn (2–1) || Perry (1–2) || || 39,020 ||  16–12
|- bgcolor="ffbbbb"
| 29 ||	May 5 || @ Twins || L 5–4 || Slowey (4–2) || Porcello (2–3) || Rauch (8) || 39,037 || 16–13
|- bgcolor="bbbbbb"
| – ||	May 7 || @ Indians || colspan=6 | Postponed (rain) – rescheduled for July 17
|- bgcolor="bbffbb"
| 30 ||	May 8 || @ Indians || W 6–4 || Verlander (3–2) || Wood (0–1) || Valverde (8) || 18,428 || 17–13
|- bgcolor="ffbbbb"
| 31 || May 9 || @ Indians || L 7–4 ||Talbot (4–2) || Scherzer (1–3) || Perez (5) || 16,980 || 17–14
|- bgcolor="bbffbb"
| 32 || May 10 || Yankees || W 5–4 || Bonine (3–0) || Mitre (0–1) || Valverde (9) || 34,365 || 18–14
|- bgcolor="bbbbbb"
| – || May 11 || Yankees || colspan=6 | Postponed (rain) – rescheduled for May 12
|- bgcolor="bbffbb"
| 33 || May 12 || Yankees || W 2–0 || Porcello (3–3) || Vázquez (1–4) || Valverde (10) || 27,376 || 19–14
|- bgcolor="ffbbbb"
| 34 ||	May 12 || Yankees || L 8–0 || Hughes (5–0) || Bonderman (1–2) || || 28,514 || 19–15
|- bgcolor="bbffbb"
| 35 || May 13 || Yankees || W 6–0 || Verlander (4–2) || Sabathia (4–2) || || 31,130 || 20–15
|- bgcolor="ffbbbb"
| 36 || May 14 || Red Sox || L 7–2 || Buchholz (4–3) || Scherzer (1–4) ||  || 31,732 || 20–16
|- bgcolor="bbffbb"
| 37 || May 15 || Red Sox || W 7–6 (12) || Valverde (1–1) || Delcarmen (1–2) ||  || 40,742 || 21–16
|- bgcolor="bbffbb"
| 38 || May 16 || Red Sox || W 5–1 || Galarraga (1–0) || Lackey (4–2) || || 35,454 || 22–16
|- bgcolor="bbbbbb"
| – || May 17 || White Sox || colspan=6 | Postponed (rain) – rescheduled for August 3
|- bgcolor="ffbbbb"
| 39 ||	May 18 || White Sox || L 6–2 || García (3–2) || Porcello (3–4) ||  ||28,155 || 22–17
|- bgcolor="bbffbb"
| 40 ||	May 19 || @ Athletics || W 5–1 || Verlander (5–2) || Braden (4–4) || || 19,284 || 23–17
|- bgcolor="bbffbb"
| 41 || May 20 || @ Athletics || W 5–2 || Bonderman (2–2) || Ross (1–2) || Valverde (11) || 24,146 || 24–17
|- bgcolor="ffbbbb"
| 42 || May 21 || @ Dodgers || L 4–1 || Billingsley (5–2) || Willis (1–2) || Broxton (9) || 44,282 || 24–18
|- bgcolor="ffbbbb"
| 43 || May 22 || @ Dodgers || L 6–4 || Ely (3–1) || Galarraga (1–1) || Broxton (10) || 45,117 || 24–19
|- bgcolor="bbffbb"
| 44 || May 23 || @ Dodgers || W 6–2 || Porcello (4–4) || Kuroda (5–2) ||  || 46,053 || 25–19 
|- bgcolor="ffbbbb"
| 45 || May 25 || @ Mariners || L 5–3 || Kelley (3–0) || Verlander (5–3) || Aardsma (10) || 20,920 || 25–20
|- bgcolor="ffbbbb"
| 46 || May 26 || @ Mariners || L 5–4 || League (4–4) || Perry (1–3) || Aardsma (11) || 22,422 || 25–21
|- bgcolor="ffbbbb"
| 47 ||	May 28 || Athletics || L 5–4 || Ziegler (2–2) || Perry (1–4) || Bailey (10) || 40,210 || 25–22
|- bgcolor="ffbbbb"
| 48 ||	May 29 || Athletics || L 6–0 || Anderson (2–1) || Porcello (4–5) || || 39,750 || 25–23
|- bgcolor="bbffbb"
| 49 ||	May 30 || Athletics || W 10–2 || Scherzer (2–4) || Braden (4–5) || Zumaya (1)|| 32,510 || 26–23
|- bgcolor="ffbbbb"
| 50 ||	May 31 || Athletics || L 4–1 || Cahill (4–2) || Verlander (5–4) || Bailey (11) || 23,641 || 26–24
|-

|- bgcolor="ffbbbb"
| 51 ||	June 1 || Indians || L 3–2 || Westbrook (3–3) || Bonderman (2–3) || Wood (3) || 19,446 || 26–25
|- bgcolor="bbffbb"
| 52 || June 2 || Indians || W 3–0 || Galarraga (2–1) || Carmona (4–4) || || 17,738 || 27–25
|- bgcolor="bbffbb"
| 53 ||	June 3 || Indians || W 12–6 || Thomas (2–0) || Ambriz (0–1) ||  || 28,169 || 28–25
|- bgcolor="ffbbbb"
| 54 ||	June 4 || @ Royals || L 7–3 || Chen (2–0) || Scherzer (2–5) ||  || 21,930 || 28–26
|- bgcolor="bbffbb"
| 55 || June 5 || @ Royals || W 4–2 || Verlander (6–4) || Hochevar (5–4) || Valverde (12) || 24,383 || 29–26
|- bgcolor="ffbbbb"
| 56 || June 6 || @ Royals || L 7–2 || Bannister (6–3) || Bonderman (2–4) ||  || 22,240 || 29–27
|- bgcolor="bbffbb"
| 57 || June 8 || @ White Sox || W 7–2 || Thomas (3–0) || Thornton (2–3) || || 20,776 || 30–27
|- bgcolor="ffbbbb"
| 58 || June 9 || @ White Sox || L 15–3 || García (6–3) || Porcello (4–6) || || 21,959 || 30–28
|- bgcolor="ffbbbb"
| 59 || June 10 || @ White Sox || L 3–0 || Danks (5–5) || Scherzer (2–6) || Jenks (10) || 26,004 || 30–29
|- bgcolor="bbffbb"
| 60 || June 11 || Pirates || W 6–2 || Verlander (7–4) || Ohlendorf (0–4) || || 33,236 || 31–29
|- bgcolor="bbffbb"
| 61 || June 12 || Pirates || W 4–3 (10) || Coke (4–0) || Donnelly (2–1) ||  || 34,501 || 32–29
|- bgcolor="bbffbb"
| 62 || June 13 || Pirates || W 4–3 || Thomas (4–0) || López (1–1) || Valverde (13) || 31,243 || 33–29
|- bgcolor="bbffbb"
| 63 || June 15 || Nationals || W 7–4 || Scherzer (3–6) || Lannan (2–4) || Valverde (14) || 24,821 || 34–29
|- bgcolor="bbffbb"
| 64 || June 16 || Nationals || W 8–3 || Verlander (8–4) || Hernández (5–4) || || 24,767 || 35–29
|- bgcolor="bbffbb"
| 65 || June 17 || Nationals || W 8–3 || Bonderman (3–4) || Atilano (5–4) || || 33,630 || 36–29
|- bgcolor="bbffbb"
| 66 || June 18 || Diamondbacks || W 7–5 || Coke (5–0) || Qualls (1–4) || Valverde (15) || 37,438|| 37–29
|- bgcolor="ffbbbb"
| 67 || June 19 || Diamondbacks || L 6–5 || Jackson (4–6) || Porcello (4–7) || Heilman (1) || 40,681 || 37–30
|- bgcolor="bbffbb"
| 68 || June 20 || Diamondbacks || W 3–1 || Scherzer (4–6) || Kennedy (3–5) || Valverde (16) || 41,417 || 38–30
|- bgcolor="ffbbbb"
| 69 || June 22 || @ Mets || L 14–6 || Nieve (2–3) || Verlander (8–5) || ||  32,363|| 38–31
|- bgcolor="ffbbbb"
| 70 || June 23 || @ Mets || L 5–0 || Dickey (6–0) || Bonderman (3–5) ||  || 35,045 || 38–32
|- bgcolor="bbffbb"
| 71 || June 24 || @ Mets || W 6–5 || Galarraga (3–1) || Takahashi (6–3) || Valverde (17) || 31,319 || 39–32
|- bgcolor="ffbbbb"
| 72 || June 25 || @ Braves || L 3–1 || Medlen (5–1) || Oliver (0–1) || Wagner (15) || 36,634 || 39–33
|- bgcolor="ffbbbb"
| 73 || June 26 || @ Braves || L 4–3 || Kawakami (1–9) ||  Zumaya (2–1)|| Moylan (1) ||39,184 || 39–34
|- bgcolor="bbffbb"
| 74 || June 27 || @ Braves || W 10–4 || Verlander (9–5) || Hanson (7–5) || || 26,034 || 40–34
|- bgcolor="bbffbb"
| 75 || June 28 || @ Twins || W 7–5 || Bonderman (4–5) || Liriano (6–6) || Valverde (18) || 40,681 || 41–34
|- bgcolor="ffbbbb"
| 76 || June 29 || @ Twins || L 11–4 || Blackburn (7–5) || Galarraga (3–2) || || 40,593 || 41–35
|- bgcolor="ffbbbb"
| 77 || June 30 || @ Twins || L 5–1 || Slowey (8–5) || Oliver (0–2) || || 40,671 || 41–36
|-

|- bgcolor="bbffbb"
| 78 || July 2 || Mariners || W 7–1 || Scherzer (5–6) || Fister (3–4) || || 32,512 || 42–36
|- bgcolor="bbffbb"
| 79 || July 3 || Mariners || W 6–1 || Verlander (10–5) || Vargas (6–4) ||  || 32,430 || 43–36
|- bgcolor="ffbbbb"
| 80 || July 4 || Mariners || L 8–1 || Lee (8–3) ||  Bonderman (4–6) || || 24,899 || 43–37
|- bgcolor="bbffbb"
| 81 || July 5 || Orioles || W 12–9 || Bonine (4–0) || Hendrickson (1–4) || || 25,432 || 44–37
|- bgcolor="bbffbb"
| 82 || July 6 || Orioles || W 7–5 (11) || Perry (2–4) || Hernandez (3–7) || ||  22,532|| 45–37
|- bgcolor="bbffbb"
| 83 || July 7 || Orioles || W 4–2 || Scherzer (6–6) || Bergesen (3–6) || || 22,837 || 46–37
|- bgcolor="bbffbb"
| 84 || July 9 || Twins || W 7–3 || Verlander (11–5) || Liriano (6–7) ||  || 42,549 || 47–37
|- bgcolor="bbffbb"
| 85 || July 10 || Twins || W 7–4 || Bonderman (5–6) || Blackburn (7–7) || Valverde (19) || 41,461 || 48–37
|- bgcolor="ffbbbb"
| 86 || July 11 || Twins || L 6–3 || Pavano (10–6) || Oliver (0–3) || Rauch (20) || 39,689 || 48–38
|- bgcolor="ffbbbb"
| 87 || July 16 || @ Indians || L 8–2 || Westbrook (6–5) || Scherzer (6–7) ||  || 22,295 || 48–39
|- bgcolor="ffbbbb"
| 88 || July 17 || @ Indians || L 4–3 || Carmona (9–7) || Coke (5–1)  || Perez (8) || 20,090 || 48–40
|- bgcolor="ffbbbb"
| 89 || July 17 || @ Indians || L 2–1 (11) || Perez (2–0) || Weinhardt (0–1) || || 20,092 || 48–41
|- bgcolor="ffbbbb"
| 90 || July 18 || @ Indians  || L 7–2 || Gómez (1–0) || Oliver (0–4) || || 19,102 || 48–42
|- bgcolor="ffbbbb"
| 91 || July 19 || Rangers || L 8–6 (14) || Harrison (2–1) || González (0–1) ||  Feliz (25) ||26,626 ||  48–43
|- bgcolor="ffbbbb"
| 92 || July 20 || Rangers || L 8–0 || Hunter (7–0) || Galarraga (3–3)  || || 27,576 || 48–44
|- bgcolor="bbffbb"
| 93 || July 21 || Rangers || W 4–1 || Scherzer (7–7) || Lewis (9–6) ||  || 28,704 || 49–44
|- bgcolor="bbffbb"
| 94 || July 22 || Blue Jays || W 5–2 || Verlander (12–5) || Romero (7–7) || Valverde (20) || 34,476 || 50–44
|- bgcolor="bbbbbb"
| – || July 23 || Blue Jays || colspan=6 | Postponed (rain) – rescheduled for July 25
|- bgcolor="ffbbbb"
| 95 || July 24 || Blue Jays || L 3–2 || Marcum (9–4) || Porcello (4–8) || Gregg (22) || 39,391 || 50–45
|- bgcolor="ffbbbb"
| 96 || July 25 || Blue Jays || L 5–3 || Downs (4–5) || Valverde (1–2) || Gregg (23) || 38,526 || 50–46
|- bgcolor="bbffbb"
| 97 || July 25 || Blue Jays || W 6–5 || Coke (6–1) || Frasor (3–3) || Valverde (21) || 37,093|| 51–46
|- bgcolor="ffbbbb"
| 98 || July 26 || @ Rays ||  L 5–0 || Garza (11–5) || Scherzer (7–8) ||  || 17,009 || 51–47
|- bgcolor="ffbbbb"
| 99 || July 27 || @ Rays || L 3–2 || Shields (9–9) || Verlander (12–6) || Soriano (27) || 19,843 || 51–48
|- bgcolor="ffbbbb"
| 100 || July 28 || @ Rays || L 7–4 || Niemann (9–3)  || Bonine (4–1) || Soriano (28) || 16,209 || 51–49
|- bgcolor="ffbbbb"
| 101 || July 29 || @ Rays || L 4–2 || Price (14–5) || Porcello (4–9) || Wheeler (2) || 26,716 || 51–50
|- bgcolor="bbffbb"
| 102 || July 30 || @ Red Sox || W 6–5 || Weinhardt (1–1) || Lester (11–6) || || 37,832 || 52–50
|- bgcolor="ffbbbb"
| 103 || July 31 || @ Red Sox || L 5–4 || Okajima (4–3) || Coke (6–2) || || 37,395 || 52–51
|-

|- bgcolor="ffbbbb"
| 104 || August 1 || @ Red Sox || L 4–3 || Papelbon (4–4) || Thomas (4–1) || || 37,479 || 52–52
|- bgcolor="ffbbbb"
| 105 || August 3 || White Sox || L 12–2 || Buehrle (10–8) || Porcello (4–10) || || 26,141 || 52–53
|- bgcolor="bbffbb"
| 106 || August 3 || White Sox ||W 7–1 || Bonderman (6–6) || Torres (0–1) || || 24,826 || 53–53
|- bgcolor="ffbbbb"
| 107 || August 4 || White Sox ||L 4–1 || Jackson (7–10) || Galarraga (3–4) || Jenks (23) || 31,770 || 53–54
|- bgcolor="ffbbbb"
| 108 || August 5 || White Sox || L 6–4 (11) ||  Santos (1–0) || Valverde (1–3) || || 34,156 || 53–55
|- bgcolor="ffbbbb"
| 109 || August 6 || Angels || L 4–2 || Weaver (11–7) || Verlander (12–7) || Fuentes (21) || 35,106 || 53–56
|- bgcolor="ffbbbb"
| 110 || August 7 || Angels || L 10–1 || Kazmir (8–9) || Bonderman (6–7) || || 38,783 || 53–57
|- bgcolor="bbffbb"
| 111 || August 8 || Angels || W 9–4 || Porcello (5–10) || Bell (1–3) ||  ||  32,037|| 54–57
|- bgcolor="ffbbbb"
| 112 || August 9 || Rays || L 6–3 || Price (15–5) || Galarraga (3–5) || Soriano (32) || 29,932 ||  54–58
|- bgcolor="ffbbbb"
| 113 || August 10 || Rays || L 8–0 || Hellickson (2–0) || Scherzer (7–9) ||  || 26,114 || 54–59
|- bgcolor="bbffbb"
| 114 || August 11 || Rays || W 3–2  || Verlander (13–7) || Garza (11–7) || Valverde (22) || 28,815 || 55–59
|- bgcolor="ffbbbb"
| 115 || August 13 || @ White Sox ||L 8–4 || Buehrle (11–9) || Bonderman (6–8) || || 34,834 || 55–60
|- bgcolor="bbffbb"
| 116 || August 14 || @ White Sox || W 3–2 || Coke (7–2) || Putz (5–4) || ||  36,548 || 56–60 
|- bgcolor="bbffbb"
| 117 || August 15 || @ White Sox || W 13–8 || Thomas (5–1) || Putz (5–5) ||  || 36,287 || 57–60
|- bgcolor="bbffbb"
| 118 || August 16 || @ Yankees || W 3–1 || Scherzer (8–9) || Vázquez (9–9) || Valverde (23) || 46,098 || 58–60
|- bgcolor="ffbbbb"
| 119 || August 17 || @ Yankees || L 6–2 || Sabathia (16–5) || Verlander (13–8) || || 46,906 || 58–61
|- bgcolor="ffbbbb"
| 120 || August 18 || @ Yankees || L 9–5 || Moseley (3–2) || Bonderman (6–9) || || 46,479 || 58–62
|- bgcolor="ffbbbb"
| 121 || August 19 || @ Yankees || L 11–5 || Hughes (15–5) || Porcello (5–11) || || 48,143 || 58–63
|- bgcolor="bbffbb"
| 122 || August 20 || Indians || W 6–0 || Galarraga (4–5) || Masterson (4–12) || || 33,936 || 59–63
|- bgcolor="bbffbb"
| 123 || August 21 || Indians || W 5–2 || Scherzer (9–9) || Tomlin (1–3) || Valverde (24) || 38,088 || 60–63
|- bgcolor="bbffbb"
| 124 || August 22 || Indians || W 8–1 || Verlander (14–8) || Gómez (3–2) || || 35,104 || 61–63
|- bgcolor="bbffbb"
| 125 || August 23 || Royals || W 12–3 || Bonderman (7–9) || Chen (8–7) || || 30,552 || 62–63 
|- bgcolor="bbffbb"
| 126 || August 24 || Royals || W 9–1 || Porcello (6–11) || Davies (6–8) || || 29,043 || 63–63
|- bgcolor="ffbbbb"
| 127 || August 25 || Royals || L 4–3 (12) || Humber (1–0) || Fígaro (0–1) || Soria (36) || 31,231 || 63–64
|- bgcolor="bbffbb"
| 128 || August 26 || @ Blue Jays || W 7–1 || Scherzer (10–9) || Romero (10–8) || || 16,088 || 64–64
|- bgcolor="ffbbbb"
| 129 || August 27 || @ Blue Jays || L 3–2 (11) || Camp (4–2) || Coke (7–3) || || 20,298 || 64–65
|- bgcolor="ffbbbb"
| 130 || August 28 || @ Blue Jays || L 5–4 || Morrow (10–6) || Fígaro (0–2) || Gregg (30) || 27,119|| 64–66
|- bgcolor="bbffbb"
| 131 || August 29 || @ Blue Jays || W 10–4 || Porcello (7–11) || Rzepczynski (1–3) || || 26,624 || 65–66
|- bgcolor="ffbbbb"
| 132 || August 31 || @ Twins || L 4–3 || Guerrier (3–7) || Coke (7–4) || Capps (33) || 40,186 || 65–67
|-

|- bgcolor="ffbbbb"
| 133 || September 1 || @ Twins || L 2–1 (10) || Rauch (3–1) || Perry (2–5) ||  || 39,438 || 65–68
|- bgcolor="bbffbb"
| 134 || September 2 || @ Twins || W 10–9 (13) ||  Valverde (2–3) || Blackburn (8–9) ||  || 39,551 || 66–68
|- bgcolor="bbffbb"
| 135 || September 3 || @ Royals || W 9–5 (11) || Perry (3–5) ||  Chavez (5–5)|| || 17,835 || 67–68
|- bgcolor="bbffbb"
| 136 || September 4 || @ Royals || W 6–4 || Porcello (8–11) || Hughes (1–2) || Valverde (25) || 21,483 || 68–68
|- bgcolor="ffbbbb"
| 137 || September 5 || @ Royals || L 2–1 || Davies (7–9) || Thomas (5–2) || Soria (37) || 19,061 || 68–69
|- bgcolor="ffbbbb"
| 138 || September 6 || White Sox || L 5–4 (10) || Sale (1–1) || Valverde (2–4) || || 32,924 || 68–70
|- bgcolor="bbffbb"
| 139 || September 7 || White Sox || W 9–1 || Verlander (15–8) || García (11–6) || || 24,905 || 69–70
|- bgcolor="bbffbb"
| 140 || September 8 || White Sox || W 5–1 || Bonderman (8–9) || Danks (13–10) || || 25,995 || 70–70
|- bgcolor="bbffbb"
| 141 || September 9 || White Sox || W 6–3 || Porcello (9–11) || Floyd (10–12) || Perry (2) || 29,995 || 71–70
|- bgcolor="ffbbbb"
| 142 || September 10 || Orioles || L 6–3 || Hernandez (6–8) || Coke (7–5) || Uehara (8) || 28,575 || 71–71
|- bgcolor="ffbbbb"
| 143 || September 11 || Orioles || L 5–3 || Guthrie (10–13) || Scherzer (10–10) || Uehara (9) || 28,139 || 71–72
|- bgcolor="bbffbb"
| 144 || September 12 || Orioles || W 6–2 || Verlander (16–8) || Gonzalez (0–3) ||  || 24,170 || 72–72
|- bgcolor="ffbbbb"
| 145 || September 14 || @ Rangers || L 11–4 || Nippert (4–4) || Weinhardt (1–2) ||  || 24,452 || 72–73
|- bgcolor="ffbbbb"
| 146 || September 15 || @ Rangers || L 11–7 || Lewis (11–12) || Galarraga (4–6) || || 34,964 || 72–74
|- bgcolor="bbffbb"
| 147 || September 17 || @ White Sox || W 9–2 || Scherzer (11–10) || Jackson (9–12) || || 28,563 || 73–74
|- bgcolor="bbffbb"
| 148 || September 18 || @ White Sox || W 6–3 || Verlander (17–8) || Santos (2–1) ||  || 27,828 || 74–74
|- bgcolor="bbffbb"
| 149 || September 19 || @ White Sox || W 9–7  (11) || Weinhardt (2–2) || Santos (2–2) || Schlereth (1) || 24,417 || 75–74
|- bgcolor="bbffbb"
| 150 || September 20 || Royals || W 7–5 || Thomas (6–2) || Greinke (9–13) || Coke (2) || 24,382 || 76–74
|- bgcolor="ffbbbb"
| 151 || September 21 || Royals || L 9–6 || Chen (11–7) || Galarraga (4–7) || Soria (40) || 26,178 || 76–75
|- bgcolor="bbffbb"
| 152 || September 22 || Royals || W 4–2 || Scherzer (12–10) || Davies (8–11) || || 24,678 || 77–75
|- bgcolor="bbffbb"
| 153 || September 24 || Twins || W 10–1 || Verlander (18–8) || Liriano (14–9) || || 30,083 || 78–75
|- bgcolor="bbffbb"
| 154 || September 25 || Twins || W 11–10 (13)  || Schlereth (1–0) || Neshek (0–1) || || 34,129 || 79–75
|- bgcolor="bbffbb"
| 155 || September 26 || Twins || W 5–1 || Porcello (10–11) || Duensing (10–3) || || 32,021 || 80–75
|- bgcolor="ffbbbb"
| 156 || September 27 || @ Indians || L 6–3 || Carrasco (2–1) || Galarraga (4–8) || Perez (22) || 10,161 || 80–76
|- bgcolor="bbbbbb"
| – || September 28 || @ Indians || colspan=6 | Postponed (rain) – rescheduled for September 29
|- bgcolor="ffbbbb"
| 157 || September 29 || @ Indians || L 4–0 || Talbot (10–13) || Scherzer (12–11) || ||  ||  80–77
|- bgcolor="ffbbbb"
| 158 || September 29 || @ Indians || L 4–3 || Tomlin (6–4) || Verlander (18–9) || Perez (23) || 12,227 || 80–78
|- bgcolor="bbbbbb"
| – || September 30 || @ Orioles || colspan=6 | Postponed (rain) – rescheduled for October 1
|-

|- bgcolor="ffbbbb"
| 159 || October 1 || @ Orioles || L 10–6 || Tillman (2–5) || Bonderman (8–10) || ||  || 80–79
|- bgcolor="ffbbbb"
| 160 || October 1 || @ Orioles || L 2–1 || Guthrie (11–14) || Porcello (10–12) || Uehara (12) || 20,870 || 80–80
|- bgcolor="ffbbbb"
| 161 || October 2 || @ Orioles || L 2–1 || Matusz (10–12) || Galarraga (4–9) || Uehara (13) || 35,332 || 80–81
|- bgcolor="bbffbb"
| 162 || October 3 || @ Orioles || W 4–2 || Schlereth (2–0) || Bergesen (8–12) || Valverde (26) || 23,914 || 81–81
|-

Player stats

Batting
Note: G = Games played; AB = At bats; R = Runs; H = Hits; 2B = Doubles; 3B = Triples; HR = Home runs; RBI = Runs batted in; SB = Stolen bases; BB = Walks; AVG = Batting average; SLG = Slugging average

Source:

Pitching
Note: W = Wins; L = Losses; ERA = Earned run average; G = Games pitched; GS = Games started; SV = Saves; IP = Innings pitched; H = Hits allowed; R = Runs allowed; ER = Earned runs allowed; BB = Walks allowed; SO = Strikeouts

Source:

Farm system

References

External links

2010 Detroit Tigers season at Baseball Reference
Detroit Tigers Official Site

Detroit Tigers seasons
Detroit Tigers
2010 in sports in Michigan
2010 in Detroit